James Thomas Anthony Bruce (born Hammersmith, 17 December 1979) is an English cricketer. He is a right-arm fast-medium bowler who is left-eye dominant, and a right-handed batsman.

James bowled a five-wicket maiden as a school boy at Farleigh School and was in the 1st XI at Eton for several years before representing Durham UCCE and playing minor county cricket for Cumberland. His exceptional control and cricket brain attracted Hampshire to sign him in 2002. Since joining Bruce spent successive winters in Australia with the Balmain Tigers in Sydney 2002-2003 and with South Perth C.C. from 2003 to 2005. Having had limited opportunities thus far to shine, he played in four first-class matches in the year 2005. He was in the Hampshire squad which won the C&G Trophy, and which finished runners-up in Division One of the Frizell County Championship. Enthused with the new responsibility of taking the new ball for Hampshire in 2006, Bruce performed brilliantly in the early stages of the season, taking a career best 5–43 against champions Nottinghamshire at the Rose Bowl in June 2006. He impressed further with a destructive opening spell of 7-2-14-3 against the touring West Indies 'A' side in August 2006. Hampshire awarded him his county cap at the end of the 2006 season and he was also mentioned as Cricinfo's 'Rising Star' for his county.

Nasser Hussain and Michael Atherton, both former England captains, recently stated on Sky Sports that if England were to pick a Hampshire bowler for the England Academy tour to Bangladesh it should have been James Bruce and not Chris Tremlett, further evidence of his rising stock.

James has let it be known that his worst experience on the cricket field was having his box split clean in half whilst facing Australian fast bowler Michael Kasprowicz.

James announced his retirement from the game on 9 February 2008, to pursue a job in the city of London.

References

External links
James Bruce at ICC-Cricket

1979 births
Living people
English cricketers
Hampshire cricketers
Durham MCCU cricketers
Cumberland cricketers
People from Hammersmith
Alumni of the College of St Hild and St Bede, Durham